EastSiders is an American dark comedy web series created by Kit Williamson. It premiered on YouTube on December 14, 2012, and began streaming through Logo TV's website on April 23, 2013. Set in Silver Lake, Los Angeles, the series follows couple Thom (Van Hansis) and Cal (Williamson) as they struggle with infidelity and substance abuse. It also explores the relationship between Kathy (Constance Wu), Cal's best friend, and her boyfriend Ian (John Halbach) as they reach their six-month anniversary, making it Kathy's longest relationship.

The first two episodes of the first season premiered on YouTube, and the subsequent seven episodes were funded by a Kickstarter campaign. On April 2, 2013, it was announced that the series was picked up for distribution through Logo TV's website, and the remainder of the season premiered on April 23, 2013. The second season premiered on September 15, 2015, through Vimeo's on demand service. The series was later sold to Netflix, and the third season premiered November 28, 2017.

Since its release, the series has received numerous accolades, including two Indie Series Awards and several Daytime Emmy Award nominations.

The fourth and final season premiered on December 1, 2019.

Series overview
In Silver Lake, Los Angeles, Cal (Kit Williamson) learns that Thom (Van Hansis), his boyfriend of four years, has been cheating on him with Jeremy (Matthew McKelligon). Though upset, Cal decides that he does not want to end the relationship. However, Cal also cheats with Jeremy. Though he intends to tell Thom about the affair, he does not. At the same time, Cal's best friend Kathy (Constance Wu) and her boyfriend Ian (John Halbach) reach their six-month anniversary, marking the relationship as Kathy's longest but Ian's shortest.

Cast

Main characters
Van Hansis as Thom—an aspiring writer and Cal's boyfriend of four years. He cheats on Cal with Jeremy, but he comes to regret it and ends the affair in episode one.
Kit Williamson as Cal—an aspiring photographer and Thom's boyfriend of four years. He works at an art gallery, which is usually empty. After learning about Thom's affair, he decides not to end the relationship. Though he admits he might never trust Thom again, he accepts it.
Constance Wu as Kathy—Cal's best friend who lives next door to Cal and Thom. She and Cal went to college together. She has been long distrustful of Thom. Her relationships are short-lived, and her six-month relationship with Ian is the longest-lasting one she has had.
Matthew McKelligon as Jeremy—with whom Thom and Cal cheat on each other. Though he is not sure what he wants out of his relationships with both men, Jeremy becomes upset that neither Thom nor Cal wish to continue seeing or talking to him. Eventually, he comes to regret his actions and apologizes to both of them. After Thom and Cal's relationship falls apart, he begins a relationship with Thom, only to realize that it is not what he wanted.
John Halbach as Ian—a landscape architect and Kathy's boyfriend of six months. She describes him as a "hipster" and is the genuine nice guy of the neighborhood.
Brianna Brown as Hillary—Cal's emotionally unstable sister (season 2–present).

Recurring cast
Brea Grant as Bri—Jeremy's lesbian sister, who has been with her partner Vi for eight years and is raising children. Grant said of Bri, she "has a good head on her shoulders and has made good decisions (unlike some of the other characters on the show)."
Sean Maher as Paul—owner of the art gallery and Cal's boss, who takes a sexual interest in Cal despite being married for ten years. He was formerly an artist himself, the art gallery is his former workspace, and he tells Cal to consider his hiring as "artistic patronage." Maher stated he was originally meant to appear in only one episode, but the role was later expanded after he began filming.
Traci Lords as Valerie—Cal's divorced mother who lives in Phoenix. She spends most of her lunch date with Cal and Thom drinking and ordering gins and is said to be "raiding the mini-bar" in the apartment shortly after. She says she would be crushed if Cal and Thom ended their relationship, and even suggests they marry.
David Blue as David.
Stephen Guarino as Quincy—a gay party promoter who is friends with the group.
Willam Belli as Douglas/Gomorrah Ray—an aspiring drag queen and door girl who becomes Quincy's love interest (season 2–present).
Satya Bhabha as Jared.
Jake Choi as Clifford (Season 4)
Aaron Marcotte as Billy (Season 4)

Episodes
The first two episodes were released through YouTube on December 14, 2012, and December 21, 2012. On April 2, 2013, Logo TV announced that it secured the rights to stream the series. The first two episodes were posted to the network's website on April 19, 2013, with the remaining episodes beginning a weekly release schedule starting April 22, 2013. Wolfe Video acquired worldwide digital and DVD rights to the feature film cut of the first season on January 15, 2014. It was released on DVD and digital download on August 12, 2014. It also became available through iTunes.

The second series premiered on September 15, 2015, with the simultaneous release of its first three episodes on Vimeo's on demand service. At the time, the series would release exclusively through Vimeo until October 3, 2015, on which release on other digital platforms and on DVD.

Season 1 (2012–13)

Season 2 (2015)

Season 3 (2017)

Season 4 (2019)

Production 
After the initial two episodes aired, the remaining seven were funded through crowdfunding via Kickstarter. The campaign began on January 7, 2013 and met its goal $15,000 four days later on January 11, 2013. The campaign closed on February 6, 2013, with $25,785 raised. The series launched a second Kickstarter campaign to fund the second season on April 14, 2014, with a goal of $125,000; the campaign closed on May 19, 2014, with $153,170 raised.

The series is filmed on location in Silver Lake, Los Angeles.

Reception
After the release of the first two episodes, The Daily Dot described the series as "charming, sharply written, and well-acted," specifically praising Guarino and Wu, and felt that the future of the series was "promising." Next Magazine also felt that the first two episodes were "top-notch", especially as it noted "the demographic [depicting the lives of young gay men] is still pretty unrepresented when it comes to well-produced series," and included the first season Kickstarter among those it recommended for backing. IndieWire recommended the series, because it was "giving Logo the kind of soap opera they should have on-air." NewMediaRockstars felt that the first season was met positively because fans "were eager for a quality series that portrayed realistic LGBT relationships without making sexual orientation the characters' defining feature."

Awards and nominations
The first season was nominated for a 2013 Satellite Award for Original Short-Form Program. LA Weekly awarded the series a 2013 Web Award for Best Web Series – Drama. It won the 2013 Indie Series Award for Best Ensemble and was nominated for five others. In 2016, EastSiders received a Daytime Emmy Award nomination for Outstanding Digital Daytime Drama Series, and Hansis was nominated for Outstanding Actor in a Digital Daytime Drama Series for portraying Thom. The series also received ten Indie Series Award nominations in 2016, including Best Web Series – Drama, and won for Best Ensemble – Drama.

References

External links
EastSiders on Logo TV
EastSiders on Facebook
EastSiders on Tumblr
EastSiders on Twitter

2012 web series debuts
2019 web series endings
American comedy web series
American drama web series
American LGBT-related web series
Gay-related television shows
2010s YouTube series
2010s American LGBT-related comedy television series
English-language Netflix original programming